Te-uri is the goddess of darkness in Tahitian mythology. She is the sister the war god 'Oro.

References 
 Robert D. Craig: Dictionary of Polynesian Mythology, 1989

Tahiti and Society Islands goddesses
Night goddesses